Stav may refer to:

Geography
Stav, Sweden location in Ekerö Municipality, 135 population

People
Stav Davidson, Australian broadcaster on Couch Time TV show and B105 FM Breakfast with Stav and Abby (redirect from Labrat Camilla and Stav)
Stav Danaos, English broadcast journalist and BBC's national weather forecaster
Stav Elimelech, (Hebrew: סתיו אלימלך, 1969), former Israeli international footballer
Stav Prodromou, (Greek: Σταύρο Εύαγγελο Προδρομου, 1944), Greek American businessman
Stav Shaffir, (Hebrew: סתיו שפיר, 1985), Israeli Knesset member
Stav Sherez, British novelist whose first novel, The Devil's Playground, was published in 2004 by Penguin
Stav Strashko, (Hebrew: 1992 סתיו סטרשקו), Israeli fashion model and actress
Stav Zalait, Israeli footballer who plays for Maccabi Netanya
Khodoriv 1394, also referred to as Khodoriv-stav
Stavros Halkias, American comedian and podcaster

Surname
Brit Stav ( 1944)  Norwegian archer at the 1972 Summer Olympics in Munich
Rabbi David Stav, chief rabbi of Shoham

Surname
Stav Abbreviated for Stavropoulos a Greek surname originated from the Arcadia region of Peloponnese Greece.
Peloponnese takes its name from the mythological figure Arcas. In Greek mythology, it was the home of the god Pan.

Acronyms
Cambodian genocide denial  "Standard Total Academic View on Cambodia" (STAV) Peace

Other
Stav-church Stave church
Stav of the rune in Pentadic numerals